Nothe, meaning "nose" may refer to the following places in Dorset, England:

 Nothe Gardens
 Nothe Fort
 Nothe Parade
 Nothe Point
 White Nothe

See also
 Nothe Grits, a Jurassic geological formation in England
 Christopher Nöthe (born 1988), a German professional footballer